Member of Parliament from 1977 to 1994
Deputy Mayor Colombo 1970-1971
Member Colombo Municipal Council 1962-1977
District Minister of Colombo 1978-1988
Minister of Petroleum Services 1988-1989
State Minister of Industries 1989-1990
Weerasinghe Mallimarachchi (died 24 October 1994) was the Cabinet Minister of Food / Co-operative and Janasaviya) of United National Party government from 1990-94. He was elected to parliament in 1977 & re-elected in 1989 and in 1994 from the Kolonnawa electorate in Colombo district in the Parliamentary election of 1994. But his political life was cut short when he was assassinated by a female suicide bomber of the Liberation Tigers of Tamil Eelam (LTTE) while attending an election rally in support of Gamini Dissanayake, for the Presidential election of 1994.

See also
List of political families in Sri Lanka

References

External links
Colombo Young Poets' Association

1929 births
1994 deaths
Assassinated Sri Lankan politicians
District ministers of Sri Lanka
Government ministers of Sri Lanka
Members of the 9th Parliament of Sri Lanka
Members of the 10th Parliament of Sri Lanka
Ministers of state of Sri Lanka
People killed during the Sri Lankan Civil War
Sinhalese politicians
Sri Lankan Buddhists
Suicide bombings in Sri Lanka
Terrorist incidents in Sri Lanka in 1994
United National Party politicians
Alumni of Dharmaraja College
Alumni of Ananda College